Bienville is a village in Bienville Parish, Louisiana, United States. The population was 218 at the 2010 census.

History
Bienville was established in 1891 when the railroad was extended to that point. It took its name from Bienville Parish.

Geography
Bienville is located near the center of Bienville Parish at  (32.352635, -92.976816).

Climate
This climatic region is typified by warm to hot (and often humid) summers and mild winters. According to the Köppen Climate Classification system, Bienville has a humid subtropical climate, abbreviated "Cfa" on climate maps.

Demographics

As of the census of 2000, there were 262 people, 115 households, and 70 families residing in the village. The population density was 23.8 inhabitants per square mile (9.2/km). There were 158 housing units at an average density of 14.3 per square mile (5.5/km). The racial makeup of the village was 56.49% White, 43.13% African American, and 0.38% from two or more races.

There were 115 households, out of which 24.3% had children under the age of 18 living with them, 44.3% were married couples living together, 11.3% had a female householder with no husband present, and 38.3% were non-families. 38.3% of all households were made up of individuals, and 21.7% had someone living alone who was 65 years of age or older. The average household size was 2.28 and the average family size was 2.97.

In the village, the population was spread out, with 23.7% under the age of 18, 5.7% from 18 to 24, 22.5% from 25 to 44, 27.1% from 45 to 64, and 21.0% who were 65 years of age or older. The median age was 43 years. For every 100 females, there were 97.0 males. For every 100 females age 18 and over, there were 88.7 males.

The median income for a household in the village was $20,227, and the median income for a family was $20,909. Males had a median income of $30,417 versus $17,143 for females. The per capita income for the village was $12,656. About 23.2% of families and 22.7% of the population were below the poverty line, including 28.8% of those under the age of eighteen and 22.5% of those 65 or over.

Notable people

 Rodney Alexander, Representative for Louisiana's 5th congressional district, was born in Bienville in 1946
 Charlie Hennigan, retired AFL player, was born in Bienville in 1935
 Garnie W. McGinty (1900–1984), historian at Louisiana Tech University in Ruston.
 Louise Peete (1880–1947), serial husband killer

References

Villages in Bienville Parish, Louisiana
Villages in Louisiana
Populated places in Ark-La-Tex
1891 establishments in Louisiana
Populated places established in 1891